Jeffrey Jackson (born January 2, 1972 in Chicago, Illinois) is a former professional baseball player who won the Gatorade High School Baseball Player of the Year Award in 1989. He later played in minor league baseball for nine seasons.

Draft and professional career 
Jackson was drafted by the Philadelphia Phillies in the first round (fourth overall) of the 1989 Major League Baseball Draft out of Simeon Career Academy. He began his professional career that season, hitting .227 in 48 games for the Martinsville Phillies. In 1990, he hit .198 in 63 games with the Batavia Clippers, and in 1991 he hit .225 in 121 games with the Spartanburg Phillies.

He split 1992 between the Clearwater Phillies (79 games) and Reading Phillies (36 games), hitting a combined .227 in 115 games. He spent all of 1993 and 1994 with Reading, hitting .238 in 113 games in 1993 and .177 in 47 games in 1994.

He did not play in 1995. In 1996, Jackson returned to organized baseball, playing for the Will County Cheetahs of the independent Heartland League and for the Daytona Cubs in the Chicago Cubs organization. He hit .300 in 26 games overall. In 1997, he played for the Cheetahs again, hitting .303 with 13 home runs in 64 games.

In 1998, Jackson spent 26 games with the Lynchburg Hillcats in the Pittsburgh Pirates system, as well as 15 games with the Fargo-Moorhead RedHawks of the independent Northern League and 26 games with the Massachusetts Mad Dogs of the independent Northeast League. He hit a combined .227 in 69 games. 1998 was his final season.

Overall, Jackson hit .234 in 666 minor league games.

References

External links

Baseball outfielders
Martinsville Phillies players
Batavia Clippers players
Clearwater Phillies players
Reading Phillies players
Will County Cheetahs players
Daytona Cubs players
Lynchburg Hillcats players
Fargo-Moorhead RedHawks players
Massachusetts Mad Dogs players
Living people
1972 births
Baseball players from Chicago